Bielsko-Biała Główna railway station is a railway station in Bielsko-Biała (Silesian Voivodeship), Poland. As of 2022, it is served by Polregio (local and InterRegio services) and PKP Intercity (EIP, InterCity, and TLK services). The station serves as a southern terminus of Express Intercity Premuim (EIP) services, the highest speed rail services in Poland, connecting to Warsaw, as well as to Gdansk-Gdynia.

Train services

The station is served by the following services:

Express Intercity Premium services (EIP) Warsaw - Katowice - Bielsko-Biała
Express Intercity Premium services (EIP) Gdynia - Warsaw - Katowice - Bielsko-Biała
Intercity services (IC) Warszawa - Częstochowa - Katowice - Bielsko-Biała
Intercity services (IC) Białystok - Warszawa - Częstochowa - Katowice - Bielsko-Biała
Intercity services (IC) Olsztyn - Warszawa - Skierniewice - Częstochowa - Katowice - Bielsko-Biała
Intercity services (IC) Ustka - Koszalin - Poznań - Wrocław - Opole - Bielsko-Biała
Intercity services (IC) Bydgoszcz - Poznań - Leszno - Wrocław - Opole - Rybnik - Bielsko-Biała - Zakopane
Regional service (PR) Bielsko-Biała Główna — Wadowice
Regional service (PR) Bielsko-Biała Główna — Wadowice - Kraków Główny
Regional Service (KŚ)  Katowice - Pszczyna - Czechowice-Dziedzice - Bielsko-Biała Gł. - Żywiec - Zwardoń
Regional services (KŚ)  Katowice - Pszczyna - Bielsko-Biała Gł - Żywiec - Nowy Targ - Zakopane
Regional services (KŚ)  Rybnik - Żory - Czechowice-Dziedzice - Bielsko-Biała Gł - Żywiec

References 

Station article at  koleo.pl

Railway stations in Silesian Voivodeship
Railway stations served by Przewozy Regionalne InterRegio
Railway station
Railway stations in Poland opened in 1855